Rogelio Valdés (1882 – death date unknown) was a Cuban baseball player in the Cuban League and Negro leagues. He played from 1899 to 1917 with several ballclubs, including Almendares, Habana, Cuban Stars (West), and the All Cubans. He was elected to the Cuban Baseball Hall of Fame in 1946.

References

External links

1882 births
Year of death missing
Cuban League players
Cuban baseball players
Punzo players
All Cubans players
Almendares (baseball) players
Azul (baseball) players
Cuban Stars (West) players
Cuban X-Giants players
Habana players
Eminencia players
San Francisco Park players
San Francisco (baseball) players
Club Fé players